The Jazz Age (1929) is a film starring Douglas Fairbanks Jr., Marceline Day, and Joel McCrea in his first leading role. The film, directed by Lynn Shores and written by Randolph Bartlett, was released by RKO Radio Pictures soon after RKO was created from Film Booking Offices of America, RCA, and the Keith-Albee-Orpheum theater chain.

Plot
Steve Maxwell (Fairbanks) and Sue Randall (Day), during an escapade, wreck one of her father's streetcars. The elder Randall uses this incident to stop the elder Maxwell (Walthall) from opposing Randall's illegal contract with the city. When Steve tells all to the city council, Mr. Randall (Ratcliffe) threatens Steve with arrest, Sue admits her culpability, and announces her intentions of marrying Steve.

Cast
Douglas Fairbanks Jr.	as Steve Maxwell
Marceline Day as Sue Randall
Henry B. Walthall	as Mr. Maxwell (billed as H. B. Walthall)
Myrtle Stedman	as Mrs. Maxwell
Gertrude Messinger	as Marjorie
Joel McCrea	as Todd Sayles
William Bechtel	as Mr. Sayles
E. J. Ratcliffe	as Mr. Randall
Ione Holmes	as Ellen McBride
Edgar Dearing	as Motor Cop

Preservation status
The film is preserved in the Library of Congress collection Packard Campus for Audio-Visual Conservation.

Production background
RKO released The Jazz Age in both a silent and part-talkie version, so the film could be shown in theaters equipped for sound, and for those not equipped for sound. The part-talkie version was recorded in RCA Photophone.

There was a later documentary film produced by NBC News Project 20, narrated by Fred Allen also titled The Jazz Age (1956), and a 15-episode TV series of the same name on the BBC (1968). Both the IMDB and TCM websites, for the 1929 film, show the 1956 film as available on DVD for purchase. No info is given about the availability of the 1929 title.

References

External links

The AFI Catalog of Feature Films:..The Jazz Age(AFI Catalog)

American silent feature films
Transitional sound films
1920s English-language films
1929 films
Films set in the Roaring Twenties
American black-and-white films
Film Booking Offices of America films
Films directed by Lynn Shores
1920s American films